The University of Kentucky Art Museum is an art museum in Lexington, Kentucky, located in the Singletary Center for the Arts building. The collection includes European and American artwork ranging from Old Masters to contemporary, as well as a selection of Non-Western objects. Featured artists include Alexander Calder, Agostino Carracci, Jean Dubuffet, Julien Dupré, Sam Gilliam, Louise Nevelson, and Gilbert Stuart, among others.

The Art Museum is located on the University of Kentucky campus in the Singletary Center for the Arts, Rose Street and Euclid Avenue.

See also
 List of museums in Kentucky

References

External links
The Art Museum at the University of Kentucky home page

Art Museumu
Art museums and galleries in Kentucky
Art museums established in 1976
University museums in Kentucky
Museums in Lexington, Kentucky
1976 establishments in Kentucky